Zarina Diyas was the defending champion, but chose to participate in Nottingham instead.

Ons Jabeur won the title, defeating Sara Sorribes Tormo in the final, 6–2, 6–1.

Seeds

Draw

Finals

Top half

Bottom half

References
Main Draw

Fuzion 100 Manchester Trophy - Singles